Unai Cuadrado Ruiz de Gauna (born 26 September 1997) is a Spanish cyclist, who currently rides for UCI ProTeam .

Major results
2019
 1st Young rider classification Vuelta a Aragón
 5th Overall Orlen Nations Grand Prix
 7th Overall Grand Prix Priessnitz spa
2020
 5th Prueba Villafranca-Ordiziako Klasika
2021 
 10th Vuelta a Murcia

References

External links

1997 births
Living people
Spanish male cyclists
Sportspeople from Álava
Cyclists from the Basque Country (autonomous community)